Sir James Wallace (1731–6 March 1803) was an officer of the Royal Navy. He served for a time as a colonial governor.

Career in England 
Wallace was born in Loddon, Norfolk in 1731 and was the son of Thomas and Mary (née Beamish) Wallace (married 1725) of Loddon. He had a brother William Wallace (b. 1730) and a sister Mary Wallace (b. 1727). His grandfather William Wallace was a son of William Wallace (b. 1632) a younger brother of Thomas Wallace the 2nd Baronet of Craige. His uncle James Wallace (b. 1691 d. 1778) reared his illegitimate daughter Frances (b. 1751). He entered the Royal Navy in 1746. He was promoted to lieutenant in 1755, and having served in the West Indies and Mediterranean in 1760, he was promoted to commander in 1762. He joined the North American Station in 1763.

An American loyalist 
Promoted to post-captain, Wallace was given command of the sixth-rate  in November 1771. In 1774 Wallace set sail in Rose for North America where he was to be based. He married Anne (or Ann) Wright in 1775 in Georgia. Wallace was sent to England with the military dispatches in 1777 and was knighted on 13 February 1777.

In 1778 the American rebels seized the British ship Alert and quickly outfitting it the American rebels used it to set fire to two other vessels carrying hay. Wallace came to the rescue with his ship Experiment and recaptured Alert and by quick action Wallace saved the ship from being burnt by the rebels. 

On 24 September 1779 Wallace and his ship Experiment along with 20 British officers and 30,000 pounds worth of silver were captured by Sagittaire off Hilton Head.  He was taken to France as a prisoner and later returned in February 1780 from France to England.

Life after American independence 
In April 1782 he was in the West Indies serving under Admiral Rodney at the Battle of the Saintes.

In 1783 Sir James Wallace and his wife Lady Wallace (née Ann Wright (b. 1749) daughter of Sir James Wright) along with members of Lady Wallace's family the Wrights were granted land in Jamaica as compensation for their lost estates in America. (Lady Wallace (née Ann Wright) should not be confused with another Lady Wallace (née Eglantine Maxwell) who was a literary personality who was married to Sir Thomas Dunlop Wallace.)

From 1782 he leased Hanworth House where his family lived for some years. Also in 1783 Sir James Wallace was involved in a complicated assault case at which Charles Bourne accused him of assaulting him when they were on the ship Warrior in 1782 on a journey to Jamaica and then in Bath Charles Bourne challenged Sir James Wallace to a duel which Wallace declined.

On 12 April 1794, Wallace was promoted to rear-admiral of the white and appointed commander-in-chief and governor of Newfoundland. During his governorship Wallace defended the coast of Newfoundland from French privateers. In August 1796 Wallace's leadership successfully defended St. John's against a French squadron of seven ships and three frigates and raised a militia known as "Skinner's Fencibles". He was promoted to vice-admiral of the white in 1795.

He departed Newfoundland in 1797 for England, and left active service. He was promoted to vice-admiral of the red in 1799 and to admiral of the blue in 1801. He died in London on 6 March 1803. He is buried at Hanworth with his uncle James Wallace and his supposed younger cousin Frances Grey Wallace the mother of Sir James Wallace Sleigh. Sir James Wallace's will confirmed that his wife was still alive at the time of his death as he mentions her as Lady Ann Wallace and her father as 'Sir James Wright the former governor of Georgia' and Wallace leaves his estate and properties and that coming from her father to her and their daughter Mary Wallace. The will also mentions Frances Sleigh (who is later buried with James and his uncle her presumed father) and her children . It is possible that Frances Gray Wallace (who married William Sleigh) was Admiral James Wallace's illegitimate daughter who was reared by his uncle as his own daughter. In the records of his life he also spent a lot of time with Frances Sleigh and her son Sir James Wallace Sleigh (who became a General and fought with Wellington at Waterloo).

See also 
 Governors of Newfoundland

References

External links 
 
 Biography at Government House The Governorship of Newfoundland and Labrador

1731 births
1803 deaths
Royal Navy admirals
Governors of Newfoundland Colony
People from Loddon